Stefanis Jakobus "Faan" Fourie (born 10 December 1982) is a South African cricketer who played two matches for Boland during the 2010–11 season. He is a right-handed batsman and right-arm medium-fast bowler.

References
Faan Fourie profile at CricketArchive

1982 births
Living people
People from Bethlehem, Free State
South African cricketers
Boland cricketers